Kampi-Ya-Chumvi is a settlement in Kenya's Eastern Province.

The settlement is an estimated 996 metres above sea level.

References 

Populated places in Eastern Province (Kenya)